Perbrinckia uva is a species of freshwater crabs of the family Gecarcinucidae that is endemic to Sri Lanka.

References

Gecarcinucoidea
Freshwater crustaceans of Asia
Crustaceans of Sri Lanka
Endemic fauna of Sri Lanka
Crustaceans described in 1998